In botany, a whorl or verticil is a whorled arrangement of leaves, sepals, petals, stamens, or carpels that radiate from a single point and surround or wrap around the stem or stalk. A leaf whorl consists of at least three elements; a pair of opposite leaves is not called a whorl.

For leaves to grow in whorls is fairly rare except in plant species with very short internodes and some other genera (Galium, Nerium, Elodea etc.). Leaf whorls occur in some trees such as Brabejum stellatifolium and other species in the family Proteaceae (e.g., in the genus Banksia). In plants such as these, crowded internodes within the leaf whorls alternate with long internodes between the whorls.

The morphology of most flowers (called cyclic flowers) is based on four types of whorls:
 The calyx: zero or more whorls of sepals at the base
 The corolla: zero or more whorls of petals above the calyx
 The androecium: zero or more whorls of stamens, each comprising a filament and an anther
 The gynoecium: zero or more whorls of carpels, each consisting of an ovary, a style, and a stigma

A flower lacking any of these floral structures is said to be incomplete or imperfect. Not all flowers consist of whorls since the parts may instead be spirally arranged, as in the family Magnoliaceae.

See also
 Cyclic flower
 Merosity
 Phyllotaxis

References

Plant morphology